is a football stadium in the city of Kashima, in Ibaraki Prefecture, Japan. It is the home stadium of the Kashima Antlers, a team in the J1 League. The stadium has a capacity of 40,728.

Before the creation of the J. League, Kashima's forerunner, Sumitomo Steel S.C., played at the nearby Sumitomo Steel plant's athletic grounds.

2002 FIFA World Cup
Kashima Soccer Stadium hosted the following three matches in the 2002 FIFA World Cup.

References

External links

  

Kashima Antlers
Kashima, Ibaraki
Football venues in Japan
2002 FIFA World Cup stadiums in Japan
2001 FIFA Confederations Cup stadiums in Japan
Sports venues in Ibaraki Prefecture
Venues of the 2020 Summer Olympics
Olympic football venues